Mokhadaji Gohil (1309–1347) was a ruler of Ghogha, near Bhavnagar in Gujarat during the mid-14th century. He was a descendant of Sejakaji Gohil of Khergadh who migrated to Saurashtra during the early 13th century. Mokhadaji Gohil was contemporary of Muhammad bin Tughluq, (1325–1351) of Tughluq dynasty in Delhi.

References 

Gohils
1347 deaths
1309 births
History of Gujarat